Eupithecia santolinata is a moth in the family Geometridae. It is found in France, Spain, Italy and on Sardinia.

The larvae feed on Santolina species.

References

Moths described in 1871
santolinata
Moths of Europe
Taxa named by Paul Mabille